August Andreas Jerndorff (25 January 1846 – 28 July 1906) was a Danish painter who is best known for his portraits.

Biography
August Jarndorff was born in Oldenburg in Lower Saxony. His parents were Just Ulrik Jerndorff (1806-1847), painter to the Oldenburg Court, and Nancy Caroline née Jones (1809-1877).

He trained first under Christian Hetsch (1830–1903), artistic director at the Royal Porcelain Factory. He attended the Royal Danish Academy of Fine Arts from 1863 to 1868 and studied privately with P. C. Skovgaard (1817–1875). He made his debut as a painter in 1866. In 1869, he received the Neuhausens Prize. In 1875, he received the Royal Academy's travel scholarship and traveled to Italy, where he lived from 1875 to 1878. He became acquainted with but remained relatively unaffected by the latest Realist tendencies in European painting.

In 1880, alongside Laurits Tuxen (1853–1927) and Frans Schwartz (1850–1917), he was a co-founder of a painting academy at Søkvæsthuset on Christianshavn in Copenhagen which served as a precursor of Kunstnernes Frie Studieskoler which were founded two years later.

He received the Thorvaldsen Medal in 1884 and became a professor at the Royal Academy of Fine Arts in 1891.

Paintings
Jerndorff started his career as a landscape painter under the influence of Skovgaard, but soon turned to portrait painting and Biblical subjects. He is best known for a number of monumental portraits which were painted for the Danish museum of National History at Frederiksborg Castle. His religious paintings include 12 Apostles for Jesus Church in Copenhagen, altar pieces for Saint Peter's Church and the church in Nykøbing Mors, and landscapes.

Decorative arts
Together with Thorvald Bindesbøll, Otto Haslund, and Joakim Skovgaard, Jerndorff also worked with ceramics in the mid-1880s, a collaboration that led to the foundation of the Dekorationsforeningen society in 1887. With the same collaborators he illustrated Holger Drachmann's Troldhøj.

Personal life
In 1875, he married Betty Marie Matthison-Hansen (1856-1940). His cousin Peter Jerndorff (1842–1926) was a stage actor and opera singer.

Gallery

See also

 Art of Denmark

References

Danish portrait painters
19th-century Danish painters
Danish male painters
20th-century Danish painters
1846 births
1906 deaths
Royal Danish Academy of Fine Arts alumni
Academic staff of the Royal Danish Academy of Fine Arts
People from Oldenburg (city)
Recipients of the Thorvaldsen Medal
Burials at Vestre Cemetery, Copenhagen
19th-century Danish male artists
20th-century Danish male artists